Mary Elizabeth Richmond  (30 August 1853 – 3 July 1949) was a New Zealand community leader, teacher and writer.

She was born in New Plymouth, New Zealand in 1853. Her parents were William Richmond and Emily Elizabeth Atkinson. She was appointed a Commander of the Order of the British Empire in the 1949 New Year Honours for services in education and welfare work. She died later that year in Wellington, was cremated, and had her ashes buried at Karori Cemetery.

References

1853 births
1949 deaths
New Zealand schoolteachers
People from New Plymouth
New Zealand writers
New Zealand women writers
Burials at Karori Cemetery
Atkinson–Hursthouse–Richmond family
New Zealand Commanders of the Order of the British Empire
Wellington Hospital Board members